Chen Jingxiong (16 October 1921 – 16 March 2022) was a Chinese engineer specializing in electromagnetism and microwave technology, and an academician of the Chinese Academy of Engineering.

Biography 
Chen was born in Zhenhai County (now Zhenhai District of Ningbo), Zhejiang, on 16 October 1921. In 1943, he was accepted to Utopia University, graduating in 1947 with a bachelor's degree. He went on to receive his master's degree in 1950 at Shanghai Jiao Tong University.

In January 1950, he served in the Beijing Institute of Posts and Telecommunications for a year before joining the Institute of Telecommunications, Ministry of Communications. He became deputy director of the 5th Research Institute of the Ministry of Defense in January 1957 and deputy director of the No. 23 Institute of the 2nd Academy of the 7th Ministry of Machinery in January 1965. In January 1980, he moved to the 2nd Research Institute of Aerospace Industry Corporation.

On 16 March 2022, Chen Jingxiong died from an illness in Beijing, at the age of 100.

Honours and awards 
 1985 State Technological Invention Award (First Class)
 1995 Member of the Chinese Academy of Engineering (CAE)

References 

1921 births
2022 deaths
People from Ningbo
Engineers from Zhejiang
Utopia University alumni
National Chiao Tung University (Shanghai) alumni
Academic staff of Beihang University
Physicists from Zhejiang
Members of the Chinese Academy of Engineering
Chinese centenarians
Men centenarians
20th-century Chinese engineers